Lamprosema latinigralis is a moth in the family Crambidae. It was described by George Hampson in 1899. It is found in the Democratic Republic of the Congo and Nigeria.

References

Moths described in 1899
Lamprosema
Moths of Africa